Chalaki may refer to:
 Chalaki, Golestan (Chālakī)
 Chalaki, Razavi Khorasan (Persian: , Chālākī)